Ludwig Vogelstein (February 3, 1871 – September 23, 1934) was a Bohemian-born American industrialist and philanthropist.

Biography
Vogelstein was born to a Jewish family in Pilsen, Austria-Hungary (now the Czech Republic) in 1871. he was the second son of rabbi Heinemann Vogelstein and sibling of :de:Hermann Vogelstein, :de:Theodor Vogelstein, and Julie Braun-Vogelstein. In Germany, he worked for Aron Hirsch & Sohn, then one of the largest metal traders in the world. In 1897, he moved from Halberstadt to the USA where he established his own metal trading firm under the name L. Vogelstein & Co., financed by the Hirsch family who retained a 35% interest. The Hirsch family used his firm as a means of strengthening relationships with US brass and copper producers and Vogelstein had a ready market to sell his materials.

Vogelstein was a staunch supporter and leader of Reform Judaism, an opponent of Zionism, and served as vice-president of the World Union for Progressive Judaism. He died on September 23, 1934 in New York City.

References

Literature (selection) 
  Encyclopedia of Judaism , Gütersloh etc. 1971, Sp. 837

1871 births
1934 deaths
American industrialists
American people of Bohemian descent
Anti-Zionist Jews
Bohemian Jews
German businesspeople in metals
German emigrants to the United States
German Reform Jews
Jewish anti-Zionism in the United States
People from Plzeň
Reform anti-Zionists